Kashk bademjan, alternatively kashk-e bademjan  or Kashk o bademjan, is a staple Iranian dish made with "kashk and eggplant" – also the literal translation of its Persian language name. The dish is served as a dip and typically garnished with liquid saffron, sautéed onions, garlic and often walnuts. It can be consumed either as an appetizer or a main dish, and is typically eaten with fresh bread.

Gallery

See also

References

External links
 Kashk-E-Bademjan Iranian Egglplant Dip from Food.com.

Iranian cuisine
Eggplant dishes